Henry Charles James (born July 29, 1965) is an American retired professional basketball player out of St. Mary's University, Texas. He played parts of seven seasons in the National Basketball Association (NBA), as well as in several other leagues.

The 6'8" small forward signed with the Cleveland Cavaliers during the 1990–91 season and in 37 games, averaged 8.1 points per game. He played with six other teams throughout his career, and once in 1996-97 as a member of the Atlanta Hawks, hit a then-record tying seven three-pointers in a quarter. He also had a career in the Philippine Basketball Association and spent parts of several seasons in the Continental Basketball Association for the Wichita Falls Texans and Sioux Falls Skyforce.

On September 7, 2006, James was charged with two counts of the felony for selling a total of $750 in crack cocaine to an undercover police officer on August 30 and September 7. His six children (all under the age of 11) were present during his last deal. In May 2007, James, of Fort Wayne, Indiana, was sentenced to serve five years in federal prison after pleading guilty to a charge of distribution of a controlled substance.

References

External links
NBA stats @ basketballreference.com
Italian League profile

1965 births
Living people
African-American basketball players
American expatriate basketball people in Italy
American expatriate basketball people in the Philippines
American men's basketball players
American people convicted of drug offenses
American sportspeople convicted of crimes
Atlanta Hawks players
Barangay Ginebra San Miguel players
Basketball players from Alabama
Basketball players from Fort Wayne, Indiana
Cleveland Cavaliers players
Houston Rockets players
Los Angeles Clippers players
People from Centreville, Alabama
Philippine Basketball Association imports
Sacramento Kings players
Sioux Falls Skyforce (CBA) players
Small forwards
South Plains Texans basketball players
St. Mary's Rattlers men's basketball players
Undrafted National Basketball Association players
Utah Jazz players
Victoria Libertas Pallacanestro players
Wichita Falls Texans players
21st-century African-American people
20th-century African-American sportspeople